Seven Oaks School Division is a school division in the north-west area of Winnipeg, Manitoba in Canada. Established in July 1959, it takes in the neighbourhoods of West Kildonan, Garden City, the Maples, Riverbend, Amber Trails, West St. Paul, and St. Andrews.

Schools
Currently, there are 21 elementary and middle schools and 6 high schools, 3 being Met schools.

Elementary and middle schools

High schools and other
Garden City Collegiate
Maples Collegiate
West Kildonan Collegiate
The Seven Oaks School Division also has Met Schools, which are high schools that essentially include both school work and practical experience/internships, similar to practicum. Opening its first Met School in 2009, the Division now has three Met School campuses and more than 240 students:

Maples Met School, located within Maples Collegiate
Seven Oaks Met School, at 640 Jefferson Avenue
Exchange Met School: Met Centre for Arts & Technology (MCAT), located in the Exchange District

Seven Oaks also has three other educational sites:

 Adult Learning Centre, at 950 Jefferson Avenue
 Adult Education Centre, at 1747 Main Street
 Wayfinders — community-based mentorship and outreach program

See also

 List of school districts in Manitoba

References

External links
 Seven Oaks School Division web page

School divisions in Winnipeg
Seven Oaks, Winnipeg